Ramlieh, also spelled Ramliye or Ramliyeh is a Lebanese village located about 34 km from the capital Beirut in the Aley District of Mount Lebanon.

External links
Ramlieh, Localiban (English)
Ramlieh, Localiban  (French)
http://www.afdc.org.lb

Populated places in Aley District
Tourist attractions in Lebanon